Pasi Kinturi is a retired Finnish association football player who played professionally in the USL A-League.  He was the 1996 USISL Premier League MVP.

Kinturi played for Malmin Palloseura youth team when it won the  1993 Helsinki Cup.  In 1994, he played for the Malmin Palloseura in the Kakkonen South Group.  He then moved to FinnPa in the Veikkausliiga.  That fall, Kinturi moved to the United States to attend Campbell University.  He played four seasons with the Campbell Fighting Camels (1994-1996, 1998).  He was a 1996 Third Team NCAA All American.  In addition to his collegiate career, Kinturi also spent the summer of 1996 with the Nashville Metros in the 1996 USISL Premier League.  He was the league’s leading scorer and MVP.  Then in 1998, he spent the summer with Malmin Palloseura back in Finland.  In 1999, Kinturi turned professional with the Hampton Roads Mariners in the USL A-League.  Brett Mosen coached the Mariners and when he moved to the Nashville Metros in 2000, he took Kinturi, and several other Mariners players, along with him.  In 2001, Kinturi again played for Malmin Palloseura.  In 2003, Kinturi signed with the Nashville Metros, now playing in the USL Premier Development League. Kinturi retired in 2006 from professional soccer after the birth of his first child.

References

Living people
1974 births
Finnish footballers
Finnish expatriate footballers
Nashville Metros players
Campbell Fighting Camels soccer players
A-League (1995–2004) players
USL League Two players
Virginia Beach Mariners players
Association football midfielders
Association football forwards
Footballers from Helsinki